The Bundeseisenbahnvermögen (BEV) is a special authority of the Federal Republic of Germany. It was called into existence by the Eisenbahnneuordnungsgesetz (ENeuOG; Railway Re-organisation Act) dated December 27, 1993.

With its current budget of €7.7 billion, it is administered by the Federal Transport Ministry and the Federal Finance Ministry. The BEV is the superior authority of all civil servants formerly belonging to the Deutsche Bundesbahn and the Deutsche Reichsbahn. It also is responsible for the pension handling of about 400,000 former railway employees and manages the railway servant health insurance fund. Its head offices are located in Bonn, while several regional offices can be found all over Germany, divided by the region they serve: East (Berlin), Central (Frankfurt am Main with branch in Saarbrücken), North (Hanover with branch in Hamburg), South West (Karlsruhe with branch in Stuttgart), West (Köln with branch in Essen) and Southern Germany (Munich with branch in Nuremberg). 138 people are employed at the BEV's head office, 791 at the various branches. Including civil-servants delegated to the Deutsche Bahn AG to serve in their former positions, the BEV has (2020) a staff of about 1,900.

Until his death on December 5, 2006 the president of the BEV was Rolf Heine. Since August 1, 2009, Marie-Theres Nonn is president of the BEV.

See also 
 BRB (Residuary) Limited, the entity formed when British Rail was dissolved

References

External links 
 Official home page 

Deutsche Bahn
Federal authorities in Bonn